is a Japanese jazz drummer and composer.

Biography 
Fukumori moved to the United States to study music when he was 17 years old. He finished his musical studies at Berklee College of Music in Boston, where he received several awards, before he relocated to Munich, Germany in 2013. He released his debut solo album For 2 Akis with his own trio, including saxophonist Matthieu Bordenave and pianist Walter Lang, on the ECM label in 2018. In 2020, Fukumori established his own label NAGALU and produced his second album Another Story.

Discography

Solo albums 
 2018: For 2 Akis (ECM Records, ECM 2574)
 2020: Another Story (nagalu, NAGALU 001/002)

Collaborations 
 With Florian Brandl
 2015: Rejuvenation (Timezone, TZ 419)
	
 With Carolyn Breuer's Shoot The Piano Player!
 2015: Volume 1 (NotNowMom! Records)	
	
 With Matthieu Bordenave Grand Angle
 2017: Terre De Sienne (Enja Records, ENJ-9650)

References

External links 
 

Japanese jazz drummers
Japanese percussionists
Japanese composers
1984 births
Living people
Musicians from Osaka